This is a list of fire departments in the world. A fire department or fire brigade also known as a fire and rescue service or fire service is a public or private organization that provides firefighting, rescue and emergency medical services for a certain jurisdiction, which is typically a municipality, county or fire protection district.

Fire departments

Albania
 Fire and Rescue Services of Albania

Andorra
 Andorran National Fire Brigade

Australia
ACT Fire and Rescue
Australian Capital Territory Rural Fire Service
Fire and Rescue New South Wales
New South Wales Rural Fire Service
Queensland Fire and Emergency Services
South Australian Metropolitan Fire Service
Country Fire Service
Tasmania Fire Service
Fire Rescue Victoria
Country Fire Authority
Department of Fire and Emergency Services

Austria
Austrian Fire Brigade Association

Bangladesh
Bangladesh Fire Service & Civil Defence

Brazil
 Firefighters Corps of Paraná State
 Military Firefighters Corps

Canada
 Canadian Forces Fire Fighters 
 Toronto Fire Services
 Vaughan Fire and Rescue Services
 Vancouver Fire and Rescue Services
 Ottawa Fire Services
 Mississauga Fire and Emergency Services
 Service de sécurité incendie de l'agglomération de Longueuil
 Service de sécurité incendie de Montréal
 Halifax Regional Fire and Emergency
 Winnipeg Fire Paramedic Service
 Edmonton Fire Rescue Services
 Calgary Fire Department

Chile
 Cuerpo de Bomberos de Santiago

China
 China Fire and Rescue
 Hong Kong Fire Services Department
 Fire Services Bureau

Cyprus
 Cyprus Fire Service

Denmark
 Greater Copenhagen Fire Department

Estonia
 Estonian Rescue Board

France

 Marseille Naval Fire Battalion
 Paris Fire Brigade

Germany
 Bundeswehr-Feuerwehr
 German fire services
 Giebelstadt Fire Department

Ghana
 Ghana National Fire and Rescue Service

Greece

 Hellenic Fire Service

India
List of Indian fire, safety and disaster management system.
 Fire wing of Central Industrial Security Force (CISF)
 Andhra Pradesh State Disaster Response and Fire Services Department
 Chandigarh Fire and Emergency Services
 Delhi Fire Service
 Directorate of Fire and Emergency Services, Goa
 Kerala Fire And Rescue Services
 Karnataka Fire and Emergency Services
 Mumbai Fire Brigade
 Odisha Fire Service
 Tamil Nadu Fire and Rescue Services
 Uttarakhand Fire and Emergency Services
 West Bengal Fire and Emergency Services

Indonesia
 Dinas Penanggulangan Kebakaran Dan Penyelamatan Kota Tanjung Pinang

Ireland

 Cork City Fire Brigade
 Dublin Fire Brigade
 25 County Fire Brigades (one for each County except Dublin)

Israel
 Israel Fire and Rescue Services

Italy
 Vigiles – the firefighters and police of Ancient Rome
 Vigili del Fuoco

Jamaica
 Jamaica Fire Brigade

Japan
 Tokyo Fire Department

Malaysia
 Malaysian Fire and Rescue Department

Morocco
 Maroc Protection Civile

New Zealand

 Fire and Emergency New Zealand

Nicaragua
 Benemerito Cuerpo de Bomberos de Masaya (Masaya, Nicaragua)

Nigeria
 Rivers State Fire Service

Pakistan

 Karachi Fire Department
 Rescue 1122, Punjab, KPK and Azad Jamu Kashmir

Philippines

 Bureau of Fire Protection 
 Bureau of Fire Protection National Capital Region 
 Bureau of Fire Protection Region I 
 Bureau of Fire Protection Region III 
 Bureau of Fire Protection Region IVA 
 Bureau of Fire Protection Region IVB 
 Bureau of Fire Protection Region VI 
 Fire District II 
 Fire District III 
 Fire District IV 
 Manila Fire District 
 Quezon City Fire District 
 Valenzuela City Fire Department
Davao City Central 911 - Fire Auxiliary Service
 Freeport Area of Bataan - Fire and Rescue
Clark Development Corporations - Public Safety Department
 Camp John Hay Fire Department
 Manila International Airport Authority - Fire and Rescue
 Subic Bay Metropolitan Authority - Fire Department

Poland

 Państwowa Straż Pożarna (PSP) - State Fire Brigade (mostly present in cities)

 Ochotnicza Straż Pożarna (OSP) - Volunteer Fire Brigade (mostly present in the countryside and in rural areas)

Romania
 Romanian General Inspectorate for Emergency Situations

Russia
 Russian State Fire Service

Singapore
 Singapore Civil Defence Force

South Korea
Korea Fire Service
 Seoul Metropolitan Fire and Disaster Management Department

Spain

Autonomous Communities Fire Services
Castilla y León - Grupo de Especialistas Bomberos de Castilla y Leon
Catalonia - Corps of Firefighters of Catalonia

City Fire Services
Barcelona - Bombers de Barcelona

Taiwan
 National Fire Agency

Tunisia 
 National Office for Civil Protection

United Arab Emirates
 Dubai Civil Defense
 Abudhabi Civil Defense
 Sharjah Civil Defense
 Ajman Civil Defense
 The General Command of the Civil Defence- RAK

United Kingdom

 London Fire Brigade

Northern Ireland
 Northern Ireland Fire and Rescue Service

United States

 US Forest Service fire fighting section

By state
 List of California fire departments
 List of Florida fire departments
 List of Georgia fire departments
 List of fire departments in Illinois
 Fire departments in Maryland
 List of New York fire departments
 List of Pennsylvania fire departments
 List of Tennessee fire departments
 List of Texas fire departments
 List of Virginia fire departments

By county
 Eastside Fire and Rescue (King County, Washington)
 List of fire departments in Orleans County, New York
 Los Angeles County Fire Department
 Miami-Dade Fire Rescue Department
 Fire departments of Morris County, New Jersey
 Santa Barbara County Fire Department
 Unified Fire Authority (Salt Lake County, Utah)

By city
 Anchorage Fire Department
 Atlanta Fire Rescue Department
 Bellevue Fire Department
 Boston Fire Department
 Capital City Fire/Rescue (Juneau, Alaska)
 Charlotte Fire Department
 Chicago Fire Department
 Denver Fire Department
 Indianapolis Fire Department
 Las Vegas Fire & Rescue Department
 Los Angeles City Fire Department
 North Las Vegas Fire Department
 Miami Fire-Rescue Department
 Milwaukee Fire Department
 New York City Fire Department
 Philadelphia Fire Department
 Pittsburgh Bureau of Fire
 Phoenix Fire Department
 Raleigh Fire Department
 San Francisco Fire Department
 Seattle Fire Department
 St. Louis Fire Department
 Vancouver Washington Fire Department

Vatican City State

 Corps of Firefighters of the Vatican City State

Venezuela 
Cuerpo de Bomberos Universidad Central de Venezuela

See also

 Combination fire department −  a type of fire department which consists of both career and volunteer firefighters
 Firefighting
 History of firefighting
 List of fires
 Volunteer fire department

References